Roman Zach is Czech actor. He was born 13 June 1973 in Ústí nad Labem, Czechoslovakia.

Biography 
He studied at a secondary technical school in Děčín. After that, he studied at DAMU in Prague.

Theatre

Prague Chamber Theatre 
Kanibalové .... gypsy
Qartet .... Valmont
Rekonstrukce .... prof. Richard Kraus/Dr. Karel Kraus
Parsifal .... parsifal
Vodičkova-Lazarská .... O
Předtím/Potom .... Phillipp
Elfriede Jelinek .... spotštyk
Žizkov .... Franta
Světanápravce .... rektor
Utrpení knížete Sternehoocha .... trhan
Nadváha, nedůležité: Neforemnost ..... Jürgen
Karlovo náměstí .... Jenda
Snílci .... Tomáš
Spiknutí .... Robert Hacken

National theatre
The Playboy of the Western World .... Christy Mahon

Playhouse, Ú.n.L.
Shopping and Fucking .... Mark
Hamlet .... Hamlet

Filmography 
Totem, tabu a andělé (1999) .... Jakub
Primetime Murder (2000)
Nikdo neměl diabetes (2001, TV Movie) .... Dr. Stanislav Misurec
Únos domů (2002) .... pan Dlouhý
Hodina tance a lásky (2003, TV Movie) .... Wolfgang "Wolfi" Weissmüller
Město bez dechu (2003)
Hop nebo trop (2003, TV Series) .... Mikuláš
Vaterland - lovecký deník (2004) .... Vilém
Redakce (2004-2005, TV Series) .... Kamil Fořt
Ordinace v růžové zahradě (2005-2006, TV Series) .... MUDr. Michal Sebek
Štěstí (2005)
Bouřlivě s tebou (2007)
Černá sanitka (2008, TV Series) .... moderator
Walking Too Fast (2009)
Zeny v pokusení (2010)
Head Hands Heart (2010) .... Lieutenant Heinrich Roth
Doktor od lesa hrochů (2010)
Cyril and Methodius: The Apostles of the Slavs (2013) .... Metodej
Fair Play (2014) .... Kríz
I, Olga Hepnarová (2016) .... Psychiatrist Vaverka
Anthropoid (2016) .... Father Petrek
Jako z filmu (2017)

References 

Roman Zach: Herecký život je o štěstí, herci jsou čekatelé na nabídky (Novinky.cz)

External links 
Roman Zach on ČSFD.cz

Roman Zach se vrací na obrazovku (Femina.cz) 

Czech male stage actors
Czech male film actors
Czech male television actors
Living people
1973 births
People from Ústí nad Labem
Academy of Performing Arts in Prague alumni
21st-century Czech male actors
20th-century Czech male actors